Love Songs is a 2005 compilation album containing the works of the American pop singer Neil Sedaka. It contains many of Sedaka's works from his years with RCA Victor from 1959-1964. Some of the tracks on the CD had never before been released. "Love Songs" was jointly issued by RCA and Legacy Records.

Track listing
 "Without a Song" (1964)
 "You Mean Everything to Me" (1960)
 "Breaking Up Is Hard to Do" (1962)
 "As Long as I Live" (1959)
 "Walk with Me" (1960)
 "We Kiss in a Shadow" (1961)
 "I Must Be Dreaming" (1961)
 "I Found My World in You" (1961)
 "Oh, Carol! (1959)
 "All the Way" (1961)
 "Because of You" (1964)*
 "Another Sleepless Night" (1959)
 "One-Way Ticket to the Blues" (1959)
 "I'll Be Seeing You" (1964)*

An asterisk indicates a recording that had not been released before 2005.

Neil Sedaka compilation albums
2005 compilation albums